Nationality words link to articles with information on the nation's poetry or literature (for instance, Irish or France).

Events

Works published

Great Britain
 Anonymous, The Court of Venus (see also The Courte of Venus 1563, a revised edition)
 Sir David Lindsay,

Other languages
 Francesco Berni (primarily) and other poets, Rime Burlesche, Venice, published posthumously, Italy
 Vittoria Colonna, an edition of her amatory and elegiac poems, published in Parma in 1538; a third edition, containing sixteen of her Rime Spirituali, in which religious themes are treated in Italian, was published at Florence soon afterwards; Italy
 Clément Marot Œuvres de Clément Marot published in Lyon; France

Births
Death years link to the corresponding "[year] in poetry" article:
 June 30 – Bonaventura Vulcanius (died 1614), Dutch humanist scholar and poet
 December 10 – Giovanni Battista Guarini (died 1612), Italian poet, dramatist, and diplomat
 Also:
 Alexander Arbuthnot (died 1583), Scottish ecclesiastic poet and clergyman whose extant poetry consists of three poems: The Praises of Wemen (4 lines), On Luve (10 lines), and The Miseries of a Pure [poor] Scholar (189 lines)
 Sir Thomas Craig (died 1608), Scottish jurist and poet
 Amadis Jamyn (died 1593), French
 Jacques Grévin (died 1570), French playwright, poet and physician
 Pablo de Céspedes (died 1608), Spanish painter, poet and architect
 Shah Hussain (died 1599), Punjabi Sufi poet and Sufi saint; born in Lahore (modern-day Pakistan); considered a pioneer of the kafi form of Punjabi poetry

Deaths
Birth years link to the corresponding "[year] in poetry" article:
 date not known – Pierre Gringore (born 1475), French poet and playwright

See also

 Poetry
 16th century in poetry
 16th century in literature
 French Renaissance literature
 Renaissance literature
 Spanish Renaissance literature

Notes

16th-century poetry
Poetry